Schoolcraft County is a county located in the Upper Peninsula of the U.S. state of Michigan. As of the 2020 Census, the population was 8,047, making it Michigan's fourth-least populous county. The county seat is Manistique, which lies along the northern shore of Lake Michigan. The county is named in honor of Henry Schoolcraft, who explored the area with the expedition of Lewis Cass. The county was founded in 1843 and organized in 1876. The county is largely rural and forested, with much of its western portion within Hiawatha National Forest.

Geography

Major highways
  – runs east and NE across south edge of county. Passes Cooks, Manistique, Gulliver, Parkington, Blaney Park.
  – runs east–west across upper middle part of county. Passes Seney.
  – enters county near NE corner. Runs south past Seney to intersection with US2 near Blaney Park.
  – enters county near NW corner. Runs south and SE to intersection with US2 near Manistique.
  – enters near SW corner of county. Runs east to intersection with US2 at Manistique.
  – runs north from Cooks through Hiawatha National Forest.

Airport
 Schoolcraft County Airport  - 3 miles NE of Manistique. County-owned public-use (general aviation). Two paved runways.

Adjacent counties
By land

 Delta County (west)
 Alger County (northwest)
 Luce County (northeast)
 Mackinac County (southeast)

By water

 Charlevoix County (southeast)
 Leelanau County (south)

National protected areas
 Hiawatha National Forest (part)
 Seney National Wildlife Refuge

Demographics

The 2010 United States Census indicates Schoolcraft County had a population of 8,485. This decrease of 418 people from the 2000 United States Census represents a -4.7% change in population. In 2010 there were 3,759 households and 2,425 families in the county. The population density was 7 people per square mile (3/km2). There were 6,313 housing units at an average density of 5 per square mile (2/km2). 87.6% of the population were White, 8.8% Native American, 0.2% Asian, 0.1% Black or African American, 0.1% of some other race and 3.3% of two or more races.  0.8% were Hispanic or Latino (of any race). 16.2% were of German, 13.2% French, French Canadian or Cajun, 7.8% Swedish, 6.7% Irish, 5.3% Polish, 5.2% English and 5.1% American ancestry.

There were 3,759 households, out of which 22.2% had children under the age of 18 living with them, 51.9% were married couples living together, 8.1% had a female householder with no husband present, and 35.5% were non-families. 30.9% of all households were made up of individuals, and 14.7% had someone living alone who was 65 years of age or older. The average household size was 2.22 and the average family size was 2.72.

The county population contained 19.9% under the age of 18, 6.0% from 18 to 24, 19.6% from 25 to 44, 33.3% from 45 to 64, and 21.3% who were 65 years of age or older. The median age was 48.3 years. The population was 49.5% male and 50.5% female.

The median income for a household in the county was $38,367, and the median income for a family was $49,561. The per capita income for the county was $21,134. About 11.7% of families and 15.1% of the population were below the poverty line, including 20.3% of those under age 18 and 9.2% of those age 65 or over.

Government
Schoolcraft County has been Republican-leaning from its start. Since 1876, the Republican Party nominee has carried the county vote in 69% of the elections (25 of 36 elections).

Schoolcraft County operates the County jail, Schoolcraft County Public Transit, maintains rural roads, operates the major local courts, records deeds, mortgages, and vital records, administers public health regulations, and participates with the state in the provision of social services. The county board of commissioners controls the budget and has limited authority to make laws or ordinances. In Michigan, most local government functions — police and fire, building and zoning, tax assessment, street maintenance, etc. — are the responsibility of individual cities and townships.

Communities

City
 Manistique (county seat)

Civil townships
 Doyle Township
 Germfask Township
 Hiawatha Township
 Inwood Township
 Manistique Township
 Mueller Township
 Seney Township
 Thompson Township

Unincorporated communities
 Blaney
 Cooks
 Germfask
 Gulliver
 Seney
 Steuben
 Thompson

Indian reservation
 The Sault Tribe of Chippewa Indians occupies a very small plot of land in southern Manistique Township.

Former settlements
Little Harbor, Michigan

Historic places
The National Register of Historic Places listings in Schoolcraft County, Michigan are:
 Ten Curves Road – Manistique River Bridge – Ten Curves Rd. over Manistique River in Gemfask Township (added December 17, 1999)
 Manistique East Breakwater Light – at offshore end of east breakwater, approx. 1,800 ft. from shore (added September 6, 2005)
 Manistique Pumping Station – on Deer St. (added October 26, 1981)
 Seul Choix Pointe Light Station – County Rd. 431 in Gulliver (added July 17, 1984)
 Ekdahl-Goudreau Site – west of Seul Choix Point (added November 16, 1978).

See also
 List of Michigan State Historic Sites in Schoolcraft County, Michigan

References

External links

 Schoolcraft County website
 Schoolcraft County Profile, Sam M Cohodas Regional Economist, Tawni Hunt Ferrarini, Ph.D.
 

 
Michigan counties
1876 establishments in Michigan
Populated places established in 1876